Apomecynoides is a genus of beetles in the family Cerambycidae, containing the following species:

 Apomecynoides linavourii Téocchi, 2011
 Apomecynoides senegalensis Breuning, 1950
 Apomecynoides tchadensis Breuning, 1977

References

Apomecynini
Cerambycidae genera